Harry De Gray (1866–1952) was the Chairman of the Shanghai Municipal Council for 2 years from 1911 to 1913.

Biography
De Gray was born in Paterson, New Jersey on 31 October 1866, the son of William M. De Gary. 

De Gray moved to Shanghai 1900.  He was manager of the China and Japan Trading Company.  

He first served on the Shanghai Municipal Council from 1902.  In 1911 he became Chairman of the Council, serving until 1913 when he returned to the United States.  He continued to serve as the President or the China, Japan and South America Trading Company and in that role continued to visit Asia from time to time.  

De Gray married Elizabeth. She died on 4 January 1934 in New Jersey.

De Gray died in 1952 and was buried in Cedar Lawn Cemetery in Paterson, New Jersey next to his wife in the family plot.

References

History of Shanghai
Chairmen of the Shanghai Municipal Council
1866 births
1952 deaths